Walsh v Kerr [1989] 1 NZLR 490 is a cited case in New Zealand regarding the remedy of damages for breach of contract.

References

Court of Appeal of New Zealand cases
New Zealand contract case law
1989 in New Zealand law
1989 in case law